Sixtymile River (also "Sixtymile Creek") (Hän: Khel ndek) is a tributary of the Yukon River, which heads in the U.S. state of Alaska before crossing into Yukon, Canada.

Geography
The upper portion of the river from the boundary to California creek can hardly be considered a navigable stream even for small boats. Below California creek, the volume of water increases and the descent becomes less difficult, but bars and rapids continue almost to the mouth and no part of the river is easy to ascend. The tributary streams are small, as a rule, but two large streams, one draining the country to the west and one other to the south, come in within four miles of each other, nearly opposite Indian River, and these branches nearly double the volume of the main river.
Below Sixtymile, the Yukon contains many islands.

The sides are usually terraced and in places, the stream for long distances, has cut a secondary rock-walled channel, similar to that noticed on Indian river and Stewart River, through the bottom of its old valley. The country bordering Sixtymile River forms part of the Yukon plateau, a highland worn into rounded hills and long zigzag ridges, but containing no well-defined and continuous mountain ranges. At several points, high hills usually of andesite, project a few hundred feet above the general level.

In addition to Miller Creek, Glacier, Gold, Little Gold, and Bed Rock creeks are all tributaries of Sixtymile. Sixtymile Butte, a prominent mountain above the headwaters of the stream, is of granite.

Geology
At the boundary and down the valley to Bedrock creek, the rocks consist principally of igneous schists of various kinds, largely granite-gneisses, with which are associated some quartzites and other clastic schists. These schists constitute the gold-bearing rocks.

History
Sixtymile and Fortymile were part of the Yukon district during the Klondike Gold Rush, with at least 1,000 men working the two streams in 1895. At the mouth of Sixtymile a townsite of that name was located and served as the headquarters for upwards of 100 miners. Messrs. Arthur Harper & Co. had a trading post and a sawmill on an island at the mouth of the stream, both of which were run by Joseph Ladue, one of the partners of the firm, and who was at one time in the employ of the Alaska Commercial Company.

See also
List of rivers of Alaska
List of rivers of Yukon

References

Rivers of Alaska
Rivers of Yukon
Tributaries of the Yukon River
Hän